, also known as Children Running Across the Rainbow, is a 1975 Japanese documentary film directed by Mariko Miyagi.

References

External links

Further reading
 
 

1975 films
Japanese documentary films
1975 documentary films
1970s Japanese films